Jorge White (12 November 1957 – 29 March 1997) was a Costa Rican footballer. He competed in the men's tournament at the 1980 Summer Olympics. He died by drowning in a pond while trying to retrieve a football.

References

External links
 

1957 births
1997 deaths
Costa Rican footballers
Costa Rica international footballers
Olympic footballers of Costa Rica
Footballers at the 1980 Summer Olympics
F.C. Motagua players
Place of birth missing
Association football forwards
L.D. Alajuelense footballers
Limón F.C. players
C.S. Cartaginés players
Puntarenas F.C. players